José Alessandro Bernardo Bagio (born April 16, 1981 in Orleans, Santa Catarina) is a Brazilian race walker. He won the gold medal for the 20,000 metres walk at the 2008 Ibero-American Championships in Iquique, Chile, with a time of 1:23:12.6.

Bagio made his official debut for the 2004 Summer Olympics in Athens, where he placed fourteenth in the men's 20 km race walk, with a time of 1:23:33. At the 2008 Summer Olympics in Beijing, Bagio repeated his position from Athens in the same event, with a well-improved, seasonal best time of 1:21:43, finishing behind Spain's Benjamin Sánchez by five seconds.

On March 31, 2011, Bagio was tested positive for the steroid called 19-Norandrosterone, during a national race walking competition in Brazil, a year before. He served a two-year suspension by IAAF, making him ineligible to compete for the 2011 Pan American Games in Guadalajara, Mexico, and most importantly, for the 2012 Summer Olympics in London.

Personal bests

Track walk
10,000 m: 39:32.0 min (ht) –  Blumenáu, 31 August 2008
20,000 m: 1:21:37.9 hrs (ht) –  Itajaí, 15 May 2004

Road walk
20 km: 1:21:43 hrs –  Beijing, 16 August 2008

Achievements

References

External links
 
 Profile – UOL Esporte 
 NBC 2008 Olympics profile

1981 births
Living people
Brazilian male racewalkers
Brazilian sportspeople in doping cases
Doping cases in athletics
Olympic athletes of Brazil
Athletes (track and field) at the 2004 Summer Olympics
Athletes (track and field) at the 2007 Pan American Games
Athletes (track and field) at the 2008 Summer Olympics
Athletes (track and field) at the 2016 Summer Olympics
Sportspeople from Santa Catarina (state)
Pan American Games athletes for Brazil
21st-century Brazilian people
20th-century Brazilian people